The American pop group the Carpenters, featuring siblings Karen and Richard Carpenter have received several awards and nominations, both in their active career and posthumously.

Throughout the 1970s, Karen and Richard were nominated numerous times for Grammy Awards. Richard Carpenter was also nominated for a Grammy Award for their instrumental song, "Flat Baroque". They won three Grammy Awards, and had two songs inducted into the Grammy Hall of Fame.

American Music Awards

Grammy Awards

|

References

Awards
Lists of awards received by American musician
Lists of awards received by musical group